Galmisdale is the main port of the island of Eigg, one of the Small Isles of the Inner Hebrides. It is in the Scottish council area of Highland.

References

Populated places in Lochaber
Villages in the Inner Hebrides
Eigg